The 2008 African U-20 Women's World Cup Qualifying Tournament was the 4th edition of the African U-20 Women's World Cup Qualifying Tournament, the biennial international youth football competition organised by the Confederation of African Football (CAF) to determine which women's under-20 national teams from Africa qualify for the FIFA U-20 Women's World Cup.

The top two teams of the tournament DR Congo and Nigeria qualified for the 2008 FIFA U-20 Women's World Cup in Chile as the CAF representatives.

Preliminary round

|}

Ghana won 7−0 on aggregate and advanced to the fisrt round.

Botswana won 4−2 on aggregate and advanced to the fisrt round.

Egypt won on away goals after 3−3 on aggregate and advanced to the fisrt round.

South Africa won 7−1 on aggregate and advanced to the fisrt round.

Cameroon won on walkover after Benin did not appear for the first leg and advanced to the fisrt round.

Nigeria  won on walkover after Congo did not appear for the first leg and advanced to the fisrt round.

DR Congo won on walkover after Namibia did not appear for the first leg and advanced to the fisrt round.

Zimbabwe won on walkover after Mauritius did not appear for the first leg and advanced to the fisrt round.

First round
The First Round matches were played from 4 to 20 April 2008.

|}

Nigeria won 4−0 on aggregate and advanced to the second round.

Ghana won 10−4 on aggregate and advanced to the second round.

DR Congo won 5−1 on aggregate and advanced to the second round.

South Africa won on walkover after Mauritius did not appear for the first leg and advanced to the second round.

Second round
The Second Round was played from 30 May to 18 June 2008. The winners of both two-legged ties have qualified directly to the 2008 FIFA U-20 Women's World Cup.

|}

Nigeria won 5−2 on aggregate and qualified for 2008 FIFA U-20 W-WC.

DR Congo won on away goals after 3−3 on aggregate and qualified for 2008 FIFA U-20 W-WC.

Qualified teams for FIFA U-20 Women's World Cup
The following two teams from CAF qualified for the FIFA U-20 Women's World Cup.

References

External links
African U-20 Women's World Cup Qualifying Tournament 2008 - rsssf.com

African U-20 Women's World Cup qualification
CAF
wome
2008 in youth association football